is a Japanese illustrator and character designer. He was born in Hyogo Prefecture and lives in Saitama Prefecture.

Works

Illustrations

Light novels
Matte te, Fujimori-kun! - Karuta Ichijō (2006, Fujimi Mystery Bunko)
The "Hentai" Prince and the Stony Cat. - Sō Sagara (2010, MF Bunko J)
Boku wa Tomodachi ga Sukunai Universe (anthology novel, cover illustration) - Yomi Hirasaka (2011, MF Bunko J)
Shinkyoku Sōkai Polyphonica Aphonic Songbird - Ichirō Sakaki (2012, GA Bunko)
A Sister's All You Need - Yomi Hirasaka (2015, Gagaga Bunko)
Sonna Sekai wa Kowashite Shimae: Qualidea Code - Sō Sagara (2015, MF Bunko J)
Märchen Mädchen - Tomohiro Matsu & StoryWorks (2017, Dash X Bunko)
Salad Bowl of Eccentrics - Yomi Hirasaka (2021, Gagaga Bunko)
Sasaki and Peeps - Buncololi (2021, MF Bunko J)

Visual novels
Angel Breath (2006, Giga)
Ame Sarasa ~Ame to, Fushigi na Kimi ni, Koi o Suru~ (2007, CUFFS)
Natsu no Ame (2009, CUBE)
Your Diary (2011, CUBE)
The "Hentai" Prince and the Stony Cat. (2013, C-Territory)
Koi Suru Kanojo no Bukiyou na Butai (2014, CUBE)
Kami-sama no You na Kimi e (2020, CUBE)

Others
Comic Market 84 catalog cover illustration

Character designs

Anime
Garakowa: Restore the World
One Room

Video games
Ange Vierge
Chain Chronicle - Lantocarte's design

Others
22/7 (Original Character Design for Sakura Fujima)
Comi-Po! (manga-maker software)
Magical Suite Prism Nana (pachislo machine)

References

External links
  
 

1985 births
Living people
Anime character designers